Shur Daraq (also Romanized as Shūr Daraq; also known as Sho Deraicht, Shoordaragh, Shordara, Shordere, and Shūr Darreh) is a village in Mishab-e Shomali Rural District, in the Central District of Marand County, East Azerbaijan Province, Iran. At the 2006 census, its population was 1,229, in 319 families.

References 

Populated places in Marand County